Merlyn Joseph "Bill" Phillips (25 May 1896 – 10 January 1978) was a Canadian professional ice hockey player. He played in the National Hockey League with the Montreal Maroons and New York Americans between 1926 and 1933. With Montreal he won the Stanley Cup in 1926. Prior to his NHL career, Philipps spent several years playing for senior Sault Ste. Marie Greyhounds. Phillips was born in Richmond Hill, Ontario.

Career statistics

Regular season and playoffs

External links
 

1896 births
1978 deaths
Canadian ice hockey centres
Ice hockey people from Ontario
Montreal Maroons players
New York Americans players
Ontario Hockey Association Senior A League (1890–1979) players
Sportspeople from Richmond Hill, Ontario
Stanley Cup champions
Windsor Bulldogs (1929–1936) players